is a Japanese novelist. Among other literary awards, she has won the Noma Literary New Face Prize and the Yomiuri Prize.

Early life
Born into a middle-class family in Tokyo, she moved to Long Island, New York at the age of twelve. Her years of reading and re-reading European literature during her childhood in post war Japan, and modern Japanese literature while attending American high school, later became the foundation for her novels. After studying studio art at the School of the Museum of Fine Arts in Boston and French at Sorbonne in Paris, she went on to Yale College, majoring in French. While still a student at Yale Graduate School, she published a critical essay, "Renunciation", on the writing of the literary critic Paul de Man upon his death. It was noticed as a precursor to later studies on de Man's work and launched her writing career.

Career
Her first novel,  Light and Darkness Continued, a sequel to Natsume Sōseki's unfinished classic, and her second, An I Novel From Left to Right, a fictionalized autobiography, were first serialized in quarterly journals edited by the literary critic Kojin Karatani. Her third, A True Novel, a re-telling of Emily Brontë's Wuthering Heights in postwar Japan, was first serialized in the monthly literary journal Shinchō. It was translated into English in 2013.

Mizumura has taught at Princeton University, the University of Michigan and Stanford University. She was a resident novelist in the International Writing Program at the University of Iowa in 2003. She won the 1991 Agency for Cultural Affairs New Artist Award, the 1996 Noma New Artist Award, and the 2003 Yomiuri Prize for Literature. Minae Mizumura now resides in Tokyo, Japan.

Writing style
She is often portrayed as a novelist who questions the conventional boundaries of national literature. Her novels include Light and Darkness Continued, An I Novel from left to right, and A True Novel, which has been selected for the Japanese Literature Publishing Project, a national program to promote translations of Japanese literature. She also writes essays and literary criticism in major newspapers and journals. Many of Minae Mizumura's works have been described as highly readable and often entertaining, while, at the same time, resonating with historical significance. They are also known for their formalistic innovations, such as making use of unusual printing formats and inserting English texts and photographic illustrations. Because she returned to Japan as an adult and chose to write in Japanese despite her coming of age in the United States and her education in English, critics have often noted her particular love for the language and her commitment to Japanese literature. Her analysis and observations on the demise of Japanese, detailed in her book of criticism titled The Fall of Language in the Age of English, gained much attention from the mainstream media as well as the Internet. In the same book, she wrote of the significance of preserving the great literary tradition established during the time of building modern Japan.

English translations
The Fall of Language in the Age of English, translated by Mari Yoshihara and Juliet Winters Carpenter, Columbia University Press
 A True Novel, translated by Juliet Winters Carpenter, Other Press
Inheritance from Mother, translated by Juliet Winters Carpenter, Other Press
 An I-Novel, translated by Juliet Winters Carpenter in collaboration with the author, Columbia University Press, March 2021

Awards and honors
1991 41st MEXT Award for New Artists
1995 17th Noma Literary New Face Prize
2003 54th Yomiuri Prize (FY2002)
2014 Best Translated Book Award, one of two runners-up for A True Novel, translated from the Japanese by Juliet Winters Carpenter

Works 
 Light and Darkness Continued (Zoku Meian), 1990.
 An I Novel from Left to Right (Shishosetu from left to right), 1995.
 Letters with Bookmarks Attached (Tegami, Shiori wo Soete), 1998.
 A True Novel, (in two volumes  )  2002.
 The Fall of the Japanese Language in the Age of English (Nihongo ga Horobiru Toki – Eigo no Seiki no Nakade), Chikuma Shobo, 2008.
 Reading in the Japanese Language (Nihongo wo Yomutoiukoto), Chikuma Shobo, 2009.
 Writing in the Japanese Language (Nihongo wo Kakutoiukoto), Chikuma Shobo, 2009.

Notes

References

External links 
  
 Minae Mizumura, Why I Write What I Write 
 J'Lit | Authors : Minae Mizumura | Books from Japan 
 Yoko Fujimoto, Contexts and 'Con-textuality' of Minae Mizumura's Honkaku-Shosetsu (A True Novel) 
  The Japanese Language: An Endangered Heritage. An interview with Mizumura Minae.
 A review of "A True Novel" in relation to Natsume Soseki's "Light and Dark"  

Japanese essayists
Japanese women essayists
Japanese literary critics
Japanese novelists
Japanese women novelists
English-language writers from Japan
People from Tokyo
1951 births
Living people
Yale College alumni
Japanese women literary critics
University of Michigan staff
International Writing Program alumni
Yomiuri Prize winners
Yale Graduate School of Arts and Sciences alumni